Strike Back: Legacy, as it is known in the United Kingdom is a ten-part British-American action television serial, and serves as the fifth series of Strike Back. The main cast of the series includes Philip Winchester, Sullivan Stapleton, Robson Green, Michelle Lukes, Milauna Jackson and Michelle Yeoh. The series, which continues the actions of the military intelligence unit Section 20, shows the team initially working to rescue the daughter of the British Ambassador in Thailand, but later the situation escalates when the plot was orchestrated by Office 39, a North Korean crime syndicate working to goad North Korea into conflict with the West.

Production began in early 2014. Midway through, production was halted for six months when Stapleton suffered a head injury; production halted to allow Stapleton's complete recovery as the cast are required to be in peak physical condition. Filming took place across Thailand and Hungary. The series premiered on 3 June 2015 on Sky1 in the United Kingdom, and would later premiere on Cinemax in the United States on 31 July. Strike Back: Legacy received generally positive reviews from television critics. Legacy was originally marketed as the final season of the series, until it was renewed for a sixth series on 8 December 2016.

Cast
Section 20
 Philip Winchester as Sergeant Michael Stonebridge, Royal Marines (former Special Boat Service)
 Sullivan Stapleton as Sergeant Damien Scott, United States Army (former Delta Force)
 Robson Green as Lieutenant Colonel Phillip Locke, British Army (former Special Air Service), the commanding officer of Section 20
 Michelle Lukes as Sergeant Julia Richmond, British Army, Chief Communications Officer for Section 20
 Milauna Jackson as Special Agent Kim Martinez, Drug Enforcement Administration (former United States Military Police)

Government Officials
 Tim McInnerny as Robin Foster, British Ambassador to Thailand
 James Wilby as Charles Ridley, Section 20's superior based in Whitehall
 Stephanie Vogt as Christy Bryant, a Central Intelligence Agency officer
 Tereza Srbova as Major Nina Pirogova, Russian Federal Security Service
 Christian Antidormi as Finn Scott, Damian Scott's estranged teenage son

Antagonists
 Michelle Yeoh as Mei Foster / Lieutenant Colonel Li Na, a North Korean sleeper agent working for Office 39
 Will Yun Lee as Lieutenant Colonel Kwon, a North Korean soldier and operative for Office 39
 Max Beesley as Ray McQueen, a British expatriate gangster in Bangkok
 Vithaya Pansringarm as Divisional Superintendent Changrok, a corrupt member of the Royal Thai Police  
 Masa Yamaguchi as Shiro, the son of a Yakuza crime lord who overseas operations in South East Asia
 Michael McElhatton as Christopher Desmond / Oppenheimer, an Irish freelance bombmaker
 Alex Humes as Ivan Myshkin, a Russian Mafia enforcer hired by Li Na and Kwon
 Dustin Clare as Faber, a Stillwater mercenary working for the CIA and later Whitehall
 Leo Gregory as Mason, a Stillwater mercenary working for the CIA and later Whitehall

Philip Winchester and Sullivan Stapleton return as the series protagonists, the "unlikely pair of counterterrorism operatives" Sergeants Michael Stonebridge and Damien Scott, respectively. Robson Green, Michelle Lukes and Milauna Jackson also return as the main characters from the last series, playing Colonel Philip Locke, Sergeant Julia Richmond and Kim Martinez, respectively.

In September 2014, Cinemax released the names of a number of guest stars to appear in the season. Max Beesley was revealed to be playing an expatriate gangster. Tim McInnerny portrays the British Ambassador to Thailand, while Michelle Yeoh plays his wife. Strike Back is the Yeoh's first television role. Meanwhile, Will Yun Lee would appear in the series, as a villainous operative of the "North Korean State Security Department". Lee and Yeoh's participation would give what Variety's Patrick Frater described as "a significant Asian angle to the fourth season". On his Twitter account, Lee described his experience as "one of the craziest, fulfilling shows I got to fire guns, fight and cause destruction in."

Other guest stars included Dustin Clare, James Wilby, Adrian Paul, Joseph Gatt, Christian Antidormi, Michael McElhatton, Leo Gregory, Mark Griffin, Wolf Kahler, Andrew Pleavin, Eliza Bennett, Masa Yamaguchi, and British mixed martial artist Michael Bisping. Stephanie Vogt is set to reprise her role as Christy Bryant from Strike Back: Vengeance. Of the guest cast, particularly Beesley and Yeoh, head of drama for Sky Cameron Roach said "it's fantastic to have Michelle and Max join the cast of Strike Back for its final season, which will be its biggest ever."

Episodes

Production

On 28 October 2013, Cinemax and Sky commissioned a ten-episode fifth series, and the fourth since Cinemax's partnership with Sky on the programme. This came with the announcement that it would also be the final series of the show. As to why Strike Back would conclude with its fifth series, Robson Green explained "you can't write a story like this, and then continue the series". The actor added; "it just got better and better and it couldn't really go anywhere else. But you should always leave your audience wanting more, and I think the finale does that. It really is a very emotional ending". Green also stated that there were talks to continue the series in some form, either on another network, on streaming media (such as Amazon Video), or produce a film, but ultimately, "towards the end, we knew it was definite that it wasn't going to go again". Producer Selwyn Roberts commented that the series would finish with "a great ending, a very American ending. When you see it, you'll know."

M. J. Bassett, Julian Holmes and Brendan Maher directed the series, while Bassett, Jack Lothian, James Dormer, Richard Zajdlic, Ed Whitmore and Tim Vaughan wrote it. The series was produced by Left Bank Pictures, with company director Andy Harries, and Sky's Cameron Roach, serving as executive producer. Michael Casey and Sharon Hughff were the series producers, while Bassett and Dormer worked as co-executive producers.

Before filming, cast members underwent intensive training sessions in order to perform stunts on the heavy action-based show. Shooting began in early 2014 in Bangkok, Thailand. According to Roberts, the crew chose to film in Thailand because "the costs are very competitive and we get a very good deal here". Filming began during the "Bangkok Shutdown", a political crisis in Thailand. Despite this, there were no filming schedule obstructions, although according to Roberts, "the only problem we had was being unable to sleep," adding that the hotel the cast and crew stayed in were blocked with political rallies "day and night until four o'clock in the morning, it was very noisy." Following the crisis, the crew found it easier to work as the military authorities were more inclined to allow them to film where and what they wanted. Outside Bangkok, filming took place in Krabi. Legacy was filmed using a variety of cameras, including Alexas, Canons, Red cameras, as well arial drones cameras. The series' visual effects were produced by Darkside Studios, having created 396 visual effects shots.

On 26 February 2014, it was reported that Sullivan Stapleton was injured while offset. At the time, the nature of the injury was undisclosed. Later, in March, it was revealed that Stapleton fell off a tuktuk, a form of public transport in Thailand, during a night out and as a result suffered a serious head injury. Beforehand, Stapleton had filmed his scenes in order to take time off to promote 300: Rise of an Empire, a film in which the actor starred in. However, he had not been able to do so since the injury. In the meantime, production continued until the principal photography in Thailand was completed. Production would later go on hiatus for six months to allow for Stapleton's complete recovery, as the cast are required to be in peak physical condition. Filming resumed in September 2014 in Hungary with additional filming returning to Thailand. The last episode of the season was primarily filmed in Slovenia.

Reception

Broadcast
Strike Back: Legacy was initially scheduled for broadcast during Summer 2014, but it had to be pushed back to the next year due to Stapleton's injury. The series first began airing in the United Kingdom on the satellite channel Sky1 on Wednesday, 3 June 2015, during the 9 to 10 pm time slot, and would air every Wednesday until its two-hour finale on 29 July. Following the broadcast of the series premier, the first four episodes were released on Sky's On Demand service. According to overnight viewing figures, the first episode was seen by 424,000, representing 2.2 per cent of the television audience during its time slot. It is considered one of the higher rated broadcasts outside terrestrial channels. However, the second episode dropped to 289,000 viewers and a 1.4 per cent audience share. The final two episodes were seen by 191,000 and 143,000 and a one per cent audience share in their respective hours.

Legacy would later begin airing in the United States on the premium cable channel Cinemax on Friday, 31 July 2015, during the 10 to 11 pm timeslot. The season would continue weekly (with the exception of a week break between episodes five and six on 4 September) until its finale on 9 October. The first series was watched by 237,000 American viewers, and a 0.09 rating in the adult 18–49 demographic.

Critical reactions

The review aggregator website Rotten Tomatoes reported a 100% approval rating with an average rating of 7.7/10 based on 11 reviews. The website's consensus reads, "Strike Back's final season promises a big finish fueled by compelling characters and sensational video game-style action". Metacritic rated the series a 74 out of 100, indicating "generally favorable reviews" from 6 critics.

Gill Crawford of the Radio Times thought it "could give the likes of Jason Bourne and Ethan Hunt a run for their money", and praised the action scenes, stating that it was "breathlessly paced, with some seriously well-choreographed chase sequences through Bangkok's canals and alleyways". Greg Ellwood of Entertainment Focus stated that the season "wasted no time on making good on the promise to be bigger and better", adding "Scott and Stonebridge popping up out of the water below the enemy hideout to pursuits on jetski and dirt bikes that have you on the edge of your seat. Adam Sweeting of The Arts Desk, however, rated Legacy two stars out of five, stating that it "won't surprise anyone, but it won't disappoint its devotees either", and that it was "a slick mix of movie-like production values and infinitesimal demands on the viewer's intellect". Ultimately, Sweeting thought that "searching for meaning in Strike Back is like asking a garden shed for investment tips, but it's amusing to watch some quite good actors trying to take the script seriously".

Home media release
Strike Back: Legacy was released on DVD in the United Kingdom by media publisher 2 Entertain on 10 August 2015.
It was released with an "18" British Board of Film Classification (BBFC) certificate (indicating it is unsuitable for viewers under the age of 18 years).

Notes

References

External links
 Strike Back at Sky1
 Strike Back at Cinemax
 

2015 American television seasons
2015 British television seasons
North Korea in fiction
L
Works about the Yakuza